= Coeloides =

Scientific classification
- Kingdom: Animalia
- Phylum: Arthropoda
- Class: Insecta
- Order: Hymenoptera
- Family: Braconidae
- Genus: Coeloides; Wesmael, 1838

Genus of insects

Coeloides is a genus of insects belonging to the family Braconidae. The species of this genus are found in Europe, Southern Africa and Northern America.

== Species ==
- Coeloides abdominalis (Zetterstedt, 1838)
- Coeloides armandi (Dang and Yang, 1985)
